Vasilios Grosdis (born 17 January 2002) is a Greek professional footballer who plays as a midfielder for Super League 2 club PAOK B.

References

2002 births
Living people
Greek footballers
Greece youth international footballers
Super League Greece 2 players
PAOK FC players
Association football midfielders
Footballers from Thessaloniki
PAOK FC B players